Adam August Krantz (6 December 1808 in Neumarkt in Schlesien – 6 April 1872 in Berlin) was a German mineralogist.

Life 
In 1833 he  founded a mineral dealership in 1833 in Freiberg while a student at Freiberg Mining Academy. In 1836 the company moved to Brüderstraße 39 in Berlin. The next move was to Bonn in 1850. August Kranz became one of the foremost mineral dealers in Europe.

August Krantz's son-in-law, Theodor Hoffmann ran the business following Krantz's death in 1872. Hoffmann sold Krantz's 
own collection of over 14,000 mineral specimens to the Mineralogisches Museum der Universität Bonn :de:Mineralogisches Museum der Universität Bonn and ran the dealership until 1888, assisted by the mineralogist Carl Hintze.
August's nephew, Friedrich Ludwig Robert Krantz (1859-1926) joined the Krantz firm in 1888 and managed it from 1891 changing the name from "A. Krantz" or "Dr. A, Krantz" to "Dr. F. Krantz and later to "Dr. F. Krantz, Rheinisches Mineralien-Kontor". In 1926 his widow Olga took charge of the business, with her nephew, Fritz Krantz. Fritz had worked for Ward's Natural Science Establishment in Rochester U.S.A. In 1974 Fritz Krantz transferred the dealership to his daughter Renate Krantz.

References

Further reading 
Krantz, R. (1984) 150 Jahre Firma Dr. Krantz.Die älteste deursche Mineralien-Handlung. Der Präparator, 30, no.1, p. 221-226. Bochum.
Fitz, O. (1993) Eine Sammlung Erzählt; Beitrage zu Inhalt und Geschichte der Mineralien- und Gesteinssammlung an der Abteilung Baugeologie des Institutes für Bodenforschung und Baugeologie, Universität für Bodenkultur, Wien. Sonderheft 1, Mitteilungen des Institutes für Bodenforschung und Baugeologie, Universität für Bodenkultur, Wien, 80 p.
Spencer, L. J. (1927) Biographical notices of mineralogists recently deceased. Mineralogical Magazine, 21, 239-240.

External links
Kranz

German mineralogists
People from Środa Śląska
1872 deaths
1809 births